General Raja Chattar Singh Attariwalla, also spelt Chatar Singh Aṭārīvālā, was Governor of Hazara province and a military commander in the army of the Sikh Empire during the reign of Maharaja Duleep Singh in the Punjab.

He fought in the Second Anglo-Sikh War against the British.

Raja Chattar Siṅgh died in Calcutta on 27 December 1855.

Family
Chatar Singh was the son of Jodh Siṅgh Aṭārīvālā.  He had two sons, Raja Sher Singh Attariwalla and Avtār Singh.  Sher Singh dealt a devastating blow on the army of the British East India Company at the Battle of Chillianwala. His daughter Tej Kaur was betrothed to Duleep Singh, but after the First Anglo-Sikh War the British Resident, Sir Frederick Currie did not honour the betrothal.

Career
On the death of his father in August 1815, Chatar Singh inherited large jagirs and occupied himself with farming his estates. He rose into political prominence in 1843, after the assassination of Maharaja Sher Singh, and his daughter Tej Kaur was betrothed to Maharaja Duleep Singh. In 1846 he was made Governor of Peshawar and the following year the Council of Regency recommended him for the title of Raja, but he asked that instead the title be conferred on his son, Sher Singh.

In 1848 he was appointed as Governor of the Hazara province. There he came into conflict with Captain James Abbott the British Deputy Commissioner of the Hazara District. Abbott alleged that Chatar Singh was conspiring to subvert British authority in the Punjab. The British Resident at Lahore,  Sir Frederick Currie commissioned an investigation by Captain John Nicholson who exonerated Chatar Siṅgh, and also justified the defensive measures he had taken to save the besieged capital of Hazārā from Abbott's Muhammadan mercenaries. Despite this, Currie virtually dismissed Chatar Singh and confiscated his jagirs. After this, and the failure of the Resident to honour the betrothal of his sister, Sher Singh, who had been fighting alongside the British, changed sides. In the second Anglo-Sikh War, Sher Singh inflicted a serious blow on the British at the Battle of Chillianwala, but was defeated at the subsequent Battle of Gujrat. Following the battle, Chatar Siṅgh and his sons, Rājā Sher Siṅgh and Avtār Singh, were imprisoned at first at Allāhābād and then at Fort William at Calcutta.

See also
Punjab Army

References

External links
Battle of Chillianwalah - second Anglo-Sikh war.

Indian Sikhs
Sikh warriors
Punjabi people